The 1911–12 season was the 41st season of competitive football in England.

Overview

Blackburn Rovers won the First Division title for the first time.
Preston North End and Bury were relegated, to be replaced by Second Division Champions Derby County and runners up, Chelsea.
Barnsley won the FA Cup in a replayed final against West Bromwich Albion; Manchester Utd won the Charity Shield with a spectacular 8–4 victory over Swindon Town.

Events

Grimsby Town returned to the Second Division after a season away. Lincoln City were the team to make way for them.

In March, Justice A.T. Lawrence established the legality of the football league's retain-and-transfer system with his judgement in the Kingaby case. Former Aston Villa player Herbert Kingaby had brought legal proceedings against his old club for preventing him from playing.  Erroneous strategy by Kingaby's counsel resulted in the suit being dismissed.

Honours

Notes = Number in parentheses is the times that club has won that honour. * indicates new record for competition

League tables

First Division

Second Division

References